Rancho Cordova is a city in Sacramento County, California, United States which was incorporated in 2003. It is part of the Sacramento Metropolitan Area. The population was 64,776 at the 2010 census. In 2010 and 2019, Rancho Cordova was named as a winner of the All-America City Award.

History

Originally called Mayhew's Crossing and Hangtown Crossing (c. 1855) during the Gold Rush era, the area was renamed Mayhew Station and Mills Station (c. 1900), respectively. The city itself was named for the Cordova Vineyard, which was located in the center of the Rancho Rio de los Americanos land grant. Other names of the town included Cordova Vineyards and Cordova Village, before it was officially named Rancho Cordova when a post office was established in the community in 1955.

In the Gold Rush era of mid-19th-century California, certain Placer mining activities took place in the Rancho Cordova environs, some traces of which disturbance are extant. Partially confined groundwater generally flows to the southwest.

For many years, Rancho Cordova was the community called ‘Mills’, located in the eastern part of the Brighton Township. It was called Mills as early as 1893, supposedly because of the old grist mills that were close by along the river. At the top of Bradshaw, along the American River, close to the oak tree that marked the northwest boundary of the Spanish Land Grant, Rancho Rio De Los Americanos, there are still some remains of foundations. You can locate them by looking for the Grist Mill Dam Recreation Area along the American River Parkway. The southwestern boundary of the grant was 300 feet west of Bradshaw not far north of Florin Road. The boundary then went due east over to Grantline Road, and northeast along the roadway.

The 35,500 acre Rancho Rio De Los Americanos was granted to William Leidesdorff in 1844 but he died in 1848, leaving the Rancho and some properties in San Francisco to his heirs. Captain Joseph Folsom purchased the Rancho from the heirs and founded a town in 1855 which he named after himself – Folsom. The old Liedesdorff adobe was constructed in 1846 in the vicinity of Routier Station.

As the miners left Sacramento traveling to the foothills in search of gold, way stations grew up along the first dirt trails, and later more formal roads, that took travelers east. Commercial establishments, hotels, or ‘stations’ were developed at one-mile intervals along the route. Many of the stations ultimately also became the US Post Office for their area, and many of these early settlers served as postmaster or postmistress.

Travelers and miners apparently headed out L Street from Sacramento (the approximate alignment of present-day Folsom Blvd) along a plank, or macadam, road that ended at present day Bradshaw Road. Brighton, also called Five Mile Station, was the site of three inns. One inn, the Magnolia House, established in 1849, was the first stop on the Pony Express Route. The location is today marked by the old Brighton Station building, visible on the south side of Folsom Boulevard where the overpasses for Highway 50 and the light rail are located. One closer stop, at four miles, was known as Hoboken or Norristown, in the vicinity of CSUS. The old Perkins building, where the Jackson Highway leaves Folsom Boulevard, and Manlove were both locations for way stations.

The vicinity of Bradshaw was Ten Mile Station, the Patterson's "American Fork House", established in 1852, and the beginning of large farms, vineyards, and orchards. Up the road was Routier Station, established in 1871. Mrs. Mayhew left Mayhew Station to take over as PostMistress at Routier Station when the post office opened in 1887. Mr. Patterson was Postmaster there for a while also. Joseph Routier was widely renowned for many years for the quality of his produce. In 1866 the railroad built the train station between Folsom Boulevard and the tracks due to the size and dependability of the crop, and the need for a formal packing shed to house the produce waiting for the train. (The station still exists as Pfingst Realty Mr. Pfingst died in 2007; the structure is owned by his daughter.)

At eleven miles, the road forked. The Coloma Road went north along the river to Coloma and the northern mines, very close to its present location; the southerly fork headed for White Rock and the Southern Mines. The area was first known as Hangtown Crossing, referencing the route to Old Hangtown – or Placerville. The southerly fork was the White Rock Road, known at that time as the White Rock – Clarksville Immigrant Road. The outcropping of white rock marked the entry into El Dorado County, and Clarksville was the first sizable settlement over the hill. 15 Mile House was built in 1850, and is commemorated with a brick cairn on White Rock Road in front of the CalTrans Emergency Ops building. It was managed by A.M. Plummer until purchased in 1857 by its most famous innkeeper, H.F.W. Deterding. His son Charles ran the hotel until at least 1890, and their hospitality was known far and wide. 15 Mile House was the second official Pony Express remount station. Eleven miles east of that, the third remount station was located at Sportsman Hall at Mormon Island, before the express riders went over the mountains headed for St. Joseph, Missouri. The Mormon Island ruins surface from under Folsom Lake at Dike 8 during low water years.

There were also way stations along the Coloma Road, such as the 14 Mile House, built on the Coloma Road in 1850 by Mr. Rush, the original builder of Deterding's 15 Mile House.
In 1852 early settlement of the Mills area included a two-story inn owned by Louis Lepetit. Four stage lines came through there, and split, with two going southeast to Placerville, and two following the river to Coloma. In the 1880s a fire destroyed the inn, and Mr. Lepetit may have rebuilt across the road on the north side.

A strong community of vineyards and orchards had grown up between the 1850s and the 1880s. Maps of the area show the familiar names of Studarus, Williamson, Mendonca, Kelley, Carroll, Shields, Dauenhauer, Lauridson, Kilgore, and Deterding. The list goes on with names that to a small extent, have been preserved as place names. John Studarus was one of the early settlers. He had thirteen children. The presumed eldest, Charles, operated the family farms; John Jr., the second or third eldest, purchased five acres of land at Hangtown Crossing, near Lepetit's site, and built a hotel. In 1911, he built the present day Mills Station. It was a general commercial building, housing a tavern and grocery store. The second floor was a large ballroom, where he celebrated the opening of the building by issuing an open invitation to everyone around to attend a grand ball. The building also housed the Post Office, and two of his children, William Henry and Helen, both ran the Post Office at various times.

William Henry Studarus died perhaps in the late 1970s, and Helen Studarus McCray, whom everyone remembers as the Post Mistress, died in 1982 or 1983. William Henry also helped his father run the store, selling groceries, hardware, and gasoline. At sometime prior to the war, the county established a branch of the free library, which local residents also remember coming to.

In 1949 Mills Station was bought by Mr. and Mrs. Lerch, parents of later Fire Chief Bob Lerch and famous baseball player Randy Lerch. Their daughter, Mrs. Doris Lauridson, held her wedding reception in the ballroom on the second floor in 1950. The general store, library, and gas station continued to serve the community. Mills Fire Department has been photographed several times with its fire trucks and firemen on parade out front. Gasoline was sold there (the pumps are visible in the 1952 photo). The building that previously sat across the street, housing the Sharp Shop, was a fire house, along with another small building on the east side of Routiers Road between Folsom Blvd. and Horn Road. The Sharp Shop, a lawn mower repair business, was finally demolished in about 2002. At that time it had deteriorated and the original walls had been replaced with corrugated metal panels, leaving virtually nothing of the original structure.

Tom Raley bought Mills Station in 1956. The Raley's organization believes he ran the grocery store, but community residents do not remember it being called Raley's. In 1972 after negotiations between the Fire District, Sacramento County, Raley's, and the Sons and Daughters of the Golden West, the building was moved to back north of the Boulevard about 200 feet. It was renovated as a restaurant but was never quite successful, and changed hands many times over 20 years. The last tenant moved out in August 1991 and the building sat idle, used only by vagrants and transients.  It was secured, preserved, and moved once again. In its final life, Mills Station has been restored as a community center at the Mather Field / Mills Light Rail Station approximately 1,000 feet from its original location.
The agricultural heritage of Rancho Cordova fell onto hard times in the 1930s and 1940s. Along with Joseph Routier's nationally recognized produce, wine from Roland Federspiel's Cordova Vineyards had been served at White House table during the Teddy Roosevelt presidency. Unfortunately, northern California went through a lengthy period of drought. Making things worse, the State Legislature raised property tax rates, setting values at "the highest and best use" as opposed to the actual use of the land. It became more and more difficult for farmers to keep their land in production.

At this point, all of the young men returning from World War II were looking for places to settle down, find a job, buy a home, and raise their families. Roland Federspiel formed a partnership with Glenn Ahlstrom and a contractor named Jacobsen to build homes on land that had previously been vineyards. Up until that point after the War, there had not been any production housing in the United States. Homes had been constructed individually or in small numbers.

Construction began at the intersection of Folsom Boulevard and Zinfandel Drive. The first three homes on the west side of the street were the model homes. Duplexes on the opposite corners originally housed the sales office and post office, then the first office of The Grapevine newspaper.

Federspiel had chosen the name Cordova Vineyards with a nod to the Cordoba Region in Spain, and wanted to preserve the Cordova name. Glenn Ahlstrom drove down to San Francisco in his old woodie station wagon and physically brought back the first ‘post box’. The US Postal Service agreed to let them use the name Rancho Cordova as it was just the right size to fit around the circle of the old postal franking stamp. They named the streets for wine grapes. It is a treat to find some of those old grapes coming back into production again, with wines like Malbec and Barbera. In recognition of that heritage, Elliott Homes named all of the streets in the Villages of Zinfandel at Stonecreek for wineries around the world when they began to build at the south end of Zinfandel in 2000.

The community grew, and Folsom Boulevard began to fill in with commercial enterprise.  Early structures included the Cordova Village Shopping Center and George E. Johnson's Cordova Inn. (George E. Johnson is the father of restaurateur Eppie Johnson. The ‘E’ stands for Eppaminondous, and Eppie used it to name a more formal restaurant on Zinfandel around 1980. The building is still in operation as a restaurant today, but is on the fourth restaurant chain since then.)

Most of the residents of the 1950s and 1960s came to work at either Aerojet, during the height of the space race, or were stationed at Mather Air Force Base. There were only a little over 1,000 homes in the Mather housing area, so most people lived off base. Along with other people who found the new Rancho Cordova a desirable place to live were the many people who came to open businesses and establish all of the organizations that any true community needs in order to thrive and prosper. Early residents opened gas stations, insurance agencies, the Hallmark Store, Baskin Robbins Ice Cream, the veterinary office, medical offices, a travel agency, churches, and the florist shop. These community builders were also the principals at the junior and senior high schools, the manager at the Chamber of Commerce, the general manager at the Park District, the chief at the Fire District, pastors and priests. They founded local branches of Rotary, Kiwanis, Optimist Club, JCs, the Moose, and the Elks .

There were attempts to incorporate Rancho Cordova in 1961 and in 1978. The 1978 effort was kept alive over the next 20 years, finally getting on the ballot in November 2002. It passed with a record 77% of voters in support, a record that still stands today.

On February 16, 2000, Emery Worldwide Flight 17 crashed in Rancho Cordova. All three crew members, the only occupants of the aircraft, were killed.

Geography

Rancho Cordova lies within the Sacramento Valley.

Climate 
As part of the greater Sacramento area, Rancho Cordova experiences a Mediterranean climate (Koppen classification: Csa). Summers are hot and dry, while winters are cool and rainy.

Transportation

Rancho Cordova is served by Sacramento Regional Transit's various bus lines and the Gold Line light rail line, though fewer than 0.1 percent of commuters to Rancho Cordova use the line according to the US Census Bureau's American Community Survey (2010–2012).

Demographics

2010
The 2010 United States Census reported that Rancho Cordova had a population of 64,776. The racial makeup of Rancho Cordova was 39,123 (60.4%) White, 8,561 (13.1%) African American, 668 (1.0%) Native American, 7,831 (12.1%) Asian (3.6% Filipino, 2.0% Indian, 1.6% Vietnamese, 1.4% Chinese, 1.0% Korean, 0.4% Japanese, 2.0% Other), 556 (0.9%) Pacific Islander, 5,517 (8.5%) from other races, and 4,520 (7.0%) from two or more races. Hispanic or Latino of any race were 12,740 persons (19.7%).

The Census reported that 64,451 people (99.5% of the population) lived in households, 170 (0.3%) lived in non-institutionalized group quarters, and 155 (0.2%) were institutionalized.

There were 23,448 households, out of which 8,722 (37.2%) had children under the age of 18 living in them, 10,521 (44.9%) were opposite-sex married couples living together, 3,815 (16.3%) had a female householder with no husband present, 1,431 (6.1%) had a male householder with no wife present.  There were 1,751 (7.5%) unmarried opposite-sex partnerships, and 198 (0.8%) same-sex married couples or partnerships. 5,815 households (24.8%) were made up of individuals, and 1,604 (6.8%) had someone living alone who was 65 years of age or older. The average household size was 2.75.  There were 15,767 families (67.2% of all households); the average family size was 3.30.

The population was spread out, with 17,011 people (26.3%) under the age of 18, 6,441 people (9.9%) aged 18 to 24, 19,508 people (30.1%) aged 25 to 44, 15,182 people (23.4%) aged 45 to 64, and 6,634 people (10.2%) who were 65 years of age or older.  The median age was 33.1 years. For every 100 females, there were 95.8 males.  For every 100 females age 18 and over, there were 92.3 males.

The homeowner vacancy rate was 3.3%; the rental vacancy rate was 8.9%.  34,907 people (53.9% of the population) lived in owner-occupied housing units and 29,544 people (45.6%) lived in rental housing units.

2000
NOTE: The following demographic numbers were enumerated prior to incorporation.

As of the census of 2000, there were 55,060 people, 20,407 households, and 13,550 families residing in the CDP. The racial makeup of the city was 66.66% White, 11.34% African American, 0.95% Native American, 8.24% Asian, 0.54% Pacific Islander, 5.72% from other races, and 6.54% from two or more races. Hispanic or Latino of any race were 12.90% of the population.

There were 20,407 households, out of which 34.1% had children under the age of 18 living with them, 44.1% were married couples living together, 16.7% had a female householder with no husband present, and 33.6% were non-families. 25.5% of all households were made up of individuals, and 6.3% had someone living alone who was 65 years of age or older.  The average household size was 2.68 and the average family size was 3.22.

The population was spread out, with 28.4% under the age of 18, 10.2% from 18 to 24, 31.9% from 25 to 44, 19.4% from 45 to 64, and 10.1% who were 65 years of age or older.  The median age was 32 years. For every 100 females, there were 95.5 males.  For every 100 females age 18 and over, there were 92.1 males.

The median income for a household in the CDP was $40,095, and the median income for a family was $60,211. Males had a median income of $54,706 versus $45,383 for females.

1980

Following the adoption of the 1978 Cordova Community Plan, the Sacramento County Local Agency Formation Commission adopted a sphere of influence for Rancho Cordova.  This is one of the defining documents of the actual community boundary for the community.

Economy
According to Rancho Cordova's 2020 Comprehensive Annual Financial Report, the top employers in the city are:

Arts and culture

Points of interest
The City of Rancho Cordova has a growing arts scene, a unique Barrel District, 26 miles of bike and pedestrian trails, 70 acres of creek channels and tributaries, and many free events. Rancho Cordova has six miles of the American River, as well as Soil Born Farms and Rancho Roots, the only working urban farms in the region.
American River Parkway
Sacramento Children's Museum
The MACC: Mills Station Arts and Culture Center 
Barrel District 
Soil Born Farms 
Rancho Roots 
Aerojet/Rocketdyne 
Edward Kelley School
Historic Sheepherder Bar & Grille - Oldest Building in Rancho Cordova - Established 1913 - 11275 Folsom Blvd Sheepherderbg

Government

City government

The City of Rancho Cordova has a council-manager form of government with five members elected to the council, one of whom serves as mayor each year. The mayor's post is thus simply that of "chief among equals for a time". As of December 2022, Rancho Cordova's mayor is Linda Budge, and David Sander is vice mayor. The other Council Members are Siri Pulipati, Garrett Gatewood and Donald Terry. Each Council Member serves the City at large, not representing any designated area or ward.

The City of Rancho Cordova has maintained nine straight years of balanced budgets. Its sound financial status has been recognized by the rating agency Standard and Poor. In July 2012 Standard and Poor's (S&P) Rating Services reaffirmed the City of Rancho Cordova's A+ long-term rating, noting the city's outlook is stable and its financial performance has been good. As a credit-rating agency, S&P issues credit ratings for the debt of public and private corporations and has been designated a nationally recognized statistical rating organization by the U.S. Securities and Exchange Commission. According to S&P, Rancho Cordova's rating reflects the city's "very strong wealth indicator, its good financial performance leading to a very strong fund balance, good financial management practices and policies, and its access to Eastern Sacramento metropolitan area." "In our opinion, Rancho Cordova's financial performance has been good with the City historically reporting consecutive surpluses," said S&P's analysis report.  "The stable outlook reflects our view that City officials will likely continue to make the budgetary adjustments needed to maintain balanced operations, supported by at least what we consider strong available fund reserves."

County government
Rancho Cordova is represented by Pat Hume and Rich Desmond on the Sacramento County Board of Supervisors.

State representation

Federal representation

Education
Rancho Cordova students are served by four different school districts and 21 post-secondary schools that provide a broad spectrum of learning opportunities. The majority of schools are in the Folsom-Cordova Unified School District that has three high schools: Cordova High School, Walnutwood High School, and Kinney High School. Two elementary schools and one high school in the Sacramento Unified School District serve students in the western portion of Rancho Cordova, and students in the recently developed Sunrise Boulevard and Douglas Road area are served by Elk Grove Unified School District. A small number of students attend schools in the San Juan Unified School District.

Data on the educational status of Rancho Cordovans shows that approximately 85% of residents 25 years or older have a high school education and 22% of residents hold some type of college or post-secondary school degree. In Sacramento County, 85% of residents 25 years or older have a high school education and 28% of residents hold some type of college or post-secondary school degree. In California, 80% of residents 25 years or older have a high school education and 30% of residents hold some type of college or post-secondary school degree.

Infrastructure

Utilities
The city is served by four water agencies and one sewage treatment agency.

Electricity is provided by Sacramento Municipal Utility District and natural gas is provided by Pacific Gas and Electric Company.

Public safety
Since incorporating in 2003, Rancho Cordova has maintained a law enforcement services contract with the Sacramento County Sheriff's Department and formed the Rancho Cordova Police Department. While deputies assigned to the Rancho Cordova Police Department wear unique "Rancho Cordova" uniform patches and drive police vehicles with "Rancho Cordova" markings, they are, in fact, sheriff's deputies. The structure of the contracted Rancho Cordova Police Department closely mirrors that of an independent police department and includes detectives, traffic enforcement, community service officers, patrol, and administration functions. Per the contract, the City of Rancho Cordova pays the salaries for 55 sworn and 7 non-sworn staff. This arrangement for contracted law enforcement services is fairly common among California cities because it requires fewer overhead costs than running an independent police department and allows the city to avoid long-term pension obligations for police employees.

The Rancho Cordova Police Department's force is hand-picked because of their skill and passion for the community. The Rancho Cordova Police Department uses a four-pronged policing approach to keep the community safe: community-oriented policing, crime prevention, problem-oriented policing and intelligence-led policing.

Sacramento Metropolitan Fire District provides fire/EMS services.

Notable people
 Chris Bosio, MLB pitcher with the Milwaukee Brewers and Seattle Mariners.
 Maelyn Dean, author of "Real Life" comics
 Lester Holt, NBC television journalist
 Geoff Jenkins, former MLB outfielder
 Neal Jimenez, screenwriter and director
 Robbie Jones, actor, One Tree Hill and Hellcats
 Jerry Manuel, former MLB player and manager
 Billy Marshall Stoneking, Australian-American poet and filmmaker
 Max Venable, 10-year MLB outfielder
 Seneca Wallace, NFL quarterback who is currently a free agent
 Gerald Willhite, former running back for the Denver Broncos
 Ken Cooley

Sister cities 
  Turrialba, Costa Rica

References

External links

City of Rancho Cordova Home Page

 
Cities in Sacramento County, California
Cities in Sacramento metropolitan area
Incorporated cities and towns in California
Populated places established in 1955
1955 establishments in California
Former census-designated places in California
Ukrainian communities in the United States